Habropoda pallida, known generally as the pallid habropoda or white-faced bee, is a species of anthophorine bee in the family Apidae. It is found in Central America and North America.

References

Further reading

 

Apinae
Insects described in 1937